Ugoszcz may refer to the following places in Poland:
Ugoszcz, Kuyavian-Pomeranian Voivodeship (north-central Poland)
Ugoszcz, Masovian Voivodeship (east-central Poland)
Ugoszcz, Pomeranian Voivodeship (north Poland)